Plotocnide is a genus of cnidarians belonging to the family Boreohydridae.

The species of this genus are found in Europe and Northern America.

Species:

Plotocnide borealis 
Plotocnide taiwanensis

References

Boreohydridae
Hydrozoan genera